Parkside Primary School is a coeducational R-7 school (5–13 year olds) located in the Adelaide inner suburb of Parkside. The school is located at 12 Robsart Street and occupies the land between Young Street, Robsart Street and Castle Street. It is one of South Australia's earliest established Primary Schools and currently has an enrolment of 410 students, who come from different cultural backgrounds.

opinion:) - I have graduated parkside and it was the best school in the universe. Miss u parkside

History
Parkside Primary School was opened on 1 April 1885. The original school building consisted of eight classrooms and had an opening enrolment of 100 students. A Headmasters house and other classrooms were constructed at later dates to account for an increased number of students. The original buildings are still in use today.

1985 was the centennial year of the school and celebrations were held throughout the year. A time-capsule was created to celebrate this milestone, to be opened in 2035.

References

External links
 Parkside Primary School Homepage

Parkside, South Australia

Primary schools in South Australia
Public schools in South Australia